Methodist viewpoints concerning homosexuality are diverse because there is no one denomination which represents all Methodists. The World Methodist Council, which represents most Methodist denominations, has no official statements regarding sexuality. British Methodism holds a variety of views, and permits ministers to bless same-gender marriages. United Methodism, which covers the United States, the Philippines, parts of Africa, and parts of Europe, concentrates on the position that the same-sex relations are incompatible with "Christian teaching", but extends ministry to persons of a homosexual orientation, holding that all individuals are of sacred worth.

African Methodist Episcopal Church
The African Methodist Episcopal Church neither expressly supports or prohibits the ordination of openly LGBTQ clergy.  However, there is no official prohibition at this time against ordination and the AME "does not bar LGBTQ individuals from serving as pastors or otherwise leading the denomination." In a historic decision, which marked the first vote on the issue of marriage rights for same-sex couples by a predominantly African-American denomination, the African Methodist Episcopal Church unanimously voted to forbid ministers from blessing same-sex unions in July 2004. The church leaders stated that homosexual activity "clearly contradicts [their] understanding of Scripture." Although the AME prohibits its ministers from officiating at same-sex weddings, the AME has "chosen to offer no official policy statements on homosexuality."  As it has no official policy on ordination, some openly gay clergy have been ordained in the AME. While the AME voted against allowing same-sex marriage, the General Conference voted to establish a committee to study and provide recommendations on changes to church teaching and pastoral care for LGBTQ members.

Allegheny Wesleyan Methodist Connection
The Allegheny Wesleyan Methodist Connection, in its Discipline, teaches in ¶44:

¶340 outlines the consequences for clergymen engaged in homosexual activity:

Argentine Evangelical Methodist Church 
The church, also called the Evangelical Methodist Church in Argentina, allows each congregation to make its own position. The church has stated that they have "given, on a national level, freedom so that each congregation accompany...these couples. We permit freedom of action in order to bless them".

Bible Methodist Connection of Churches 
The Bible Methodist Connection of Churches, in its Discipline, states in ¶42 that:

In ¶44, it further states that:

¶45 of the Discipline of the Bible Methodist Connection of Churches specifically prohibits its clergymen from officiating at same-sex marriages.

Church of the Nazarene 
The Church of the Nazarene, a Methodist/Holiness denomination, teaches that marriage is only defined for heterosexual couples. As such, the denomination does not allow same-gender marriages.

Church of North India 
The denomination, uniting different Protestants including Methodists, takes a traditional stand on human sexuality maintaining that marriage is defined heterosexually. The church opposes the criminalization of homosexuality, but also opposed the consecration of the first homosexual bishop in the Episcopal Church, the Rt. Rev. Gene Robinson. In 2009, the church both opposed the supreme court's decision to criminalize homosexuality, and also opposed same-sex marriage.

Church of South India 
The Church of South India (CSI) is a united church representing Anglicans, Methodists, and Presbyterians. The CSI "is a relatively liberal Protestant church which has, since 1984, allowed women to become pastors. 'CSI has been liberal on these issues. It has taken up issues of gender, dalits and landlessness. It has to address the issue of sexual minorities too"'. In 2009, the Rev. Christopher Rajkumar, speaking for the CSI, supported civil rights for gay people. In 2015, St. Mark's Cathedral in Bangalore hosted an event challenging homophobia where the Rev. Vincent Rajkumar affirmed his support for LGBT rights.  The BBC has listed the CSI as being among the churches open to blessing same-gender couples.

Evangelical Methodist Church
The Evangelical Methodist Church maintains that the biblical record condemns homosexuality as evidenced in Leviticus , Romans , and 1 Corinthians . It teaches that homosexual practices are "sin leading to spiritual death and eternal punishment. Nevertheless, homosexuality is no greater a sin than adultery, murder, stealing, among others. As a result, non-celibate gay people are barred from becoming members of the Evangelical Methodist Church. Moreover, practicing homosexuals are prohibited from becoming candidates for ordained ministry. The Church upholds that all individuals are entitled to certain rights and protection of the civil law; nevertheless, it opposes all civil legislation that supports homosexuality as a normal life style. All homosexuals who seek faith in Jesus Christ as Saviour and Lord, and cease to practice homosexual acts are welcomed into the fellowship of the Evangelical Methodist Church.

Evangelical Wesleyan Church
The Evangelical Wesleyan Church, in ¶92.1 and ¶92.2 of its Discipline, teaches that:

Free Methodist Church
As stated in the Book of Discipline (A/342) of the Free Methodist Church, it believes and teaches that

Italian Methodist Church 
The Union of Methodist and Waldensian Churches, of which the Italian Methodist Church is a part of, voted in 2010 to bless same-sex relationships. LGBT-affirming church leaders said "the references to homosexuality in the Bible needed to be understood taking into account issue of culture and interpretation, to avoid the danger of Biblical fundamentalism."

Methodist Church of Great Britain
At the annual Methodist Conference in 1993 in Derby, following long debate at all levels of the Church's life on the basis of a detailed report, the British Methodist Church considered the issues of human sexuality. The Derby Conference in 1993 passed a series of Resolutions which still stand. These resolutions are as follows:
 The Conference, affirming the joy of human sexuality as God's gift and the place of every human being within the grace of God, recognises the responsibility that flows from this for us all. It therefore welcomes the serious, prayerful and sometimes costly consideration given to this issue by The Methodist Church.
 All practices of sexuality, which are promiscuous, exploitative or demeaning in any way are unacceptable forms of behaviour and contradict God's purpose for us all.
 A person shall not be debarred from church on the grounds of sexual orientation in itself.
 The Conference reaffirms the traditional teaching of the Church on human sexuality; namely chastity for all outside marriage and fidelity within it. The Conference directs that this affirmation is made clear to all candidates for ministry, office and membership, and having established this, affirm that the existing procedures of our church are adequate to deal with all such cases.
 The Conference resolves that its decision in this debate shall not be used to form the basis of a disciplinary charge against any person in relation to conduct alleged to have taken place before such decisions were made.
 Conference recognises, affirms and celebrates the participation and ministry of lesbians and gay men in the church. Conference calls on the Methodist people to begin a pilgrimage of faith to combat repression and discrimination, to work for justice and human rights and to give dignity and worth to people whatever their sexuality.

In 2005, the church voted "to offer the prospect of blessing services for same-sex couples", but in 2006 the church voted to step back but did offer "informal, private prayers to couples". In 2013, the denomination initiated a consultation on blessing same-sex marriages, and, in 2014, after same-sex marriage became legal, the Methodist Church decided in favor of allowing ministers to celebrate same-sex couples entering into civil marriages. Also in 2014, "the Conference resolved that its previous ruling that there was no reason per se to prevent anyone within the Church, ordained or lay, from entering into or remaining within a civil partnership, should also extend to those entering into legally contracted same-sex marriages".

The denomination officially stated that Methodists may enter into same-sex marriages and that "prayers of thanksgiving or celebration may be said, and there may be informal services of thanksgiving or celebration".

On 3 July 2019, the British Methodist Conference voted by 247 votes to 48 to allow same-sex marriages in British Methodist churches that approve.

On 30 June 2021, the Conference voted to reaffirm the resolution of the 2019 Conference, and consented in principle to the marriage of same-sex couples on Methodist premises and by Methodist ministers and other authorised officers. The traditionalist caucus, Methodist Evangelicals Together, opposed the decision.

Methodist Church of New Zealand 
The Methodist Church of New Zealand, since 2004, has approved of ordaining openly gay and lesbian ministers, and the denomination allows each local congregation to determine its own policy on the issue. In 2013, when same-sex marriage was legalized in New Zealand, congregations that opted to do so were able to perform same-sex marriages.

Methodist Church of Peru 
The Methodist Church of Peru, an autonomous affiliate of the United Methodist Church, has agreed to discuss the issue of homosexuality and the blessing of same-gender unions. Generally, the denomination is considered to be a progressive church in Peru.

Methodist Church of Southern Africa 
The Methodist Church of Southern Africa spoke out against laws criminalizing homosexuality, and, in particular, condemned the anti-homosexuality laws proposed in Uganda. Currently, the denomination is discussing how to approach the issue of same-gender relationships.  Currently, “Conference recognises that any decision and subsequent action on the issue of civil unions between same sex partners must await the outcome of the ongoing process of engagement as specified by Conference 2005 and, in the interim, expects Methodist Ministers to continue to offer pastoral care to homosexual individuals." Several courts have concluded that the church's policies are currently accepting of same-sex relationships as long as they are not 'marriages'. In 2020, the MCSA decided that it would not allow ministers to perform same-sex marriages, but also decided that it would not prevent its members, lay or ordained, from entering into a same-sex civil union.

In 2013, the Western Cape High Court found that "the Methodist Church did not have a rule prohibiting its ministers from marrying someone of the same sex". Additionally, in 2015, another court determined that the denomination "even accepts same-sex relationships (as long as such relationships are not solemnised by marriage), which means it is not at the core of the Church’s beliefs". At the Constitutional Court, the church stated that the church "tolerates homosexual relationships but requires its ministers not to enter into same-sex marriages." The Church allowed [gay ministers] to be in a homosexual relationship whilst being a minister, and allowed [a gay minister] to stay in the Church’s manse with [a] partner, but drew the line at recognising her same-sex marriage."

Methodist Church of Uruguay 
The church, part of the Evangelical Church of Uruguay, "has a ministry with persons of diverse sexual orientations". The denomination "resolved that pastors that wish to minister to homosexuals could do so freely". Since then, some congregations have provided blessing services for same-gender couples.

Primitive Methodist Church
The Primitive Methodist Church teaches that the practice of homosexuality is positively forbidden by Scripture, specifically in Romans 1:26-27 and Leviticus 18:22; 20:13. With regards to marriage, the Primitive Methodist Church believes it to involve the total commitment of one man and one woman.

United Church of Canada 
The United Church of Canada, a member of the World Methodist Council, is a united church which resulted from the merger of multiple denominations including Methodists. The denomination is supportive of LGBT inclusion. The church ordains openly gay and lesbian clergy, and, in 2012, elected its first openly gay moderator to lead the whole denomination. Since 2003, the UCC has supported same-gender marriage.

United Methodist Church

In 1972 the United Methodist Church added language to its Book of Discipline of The United Methodist Church that "homosexual persons no less than heterosexual persons are individuals of sacred worth." In other words, all individuals are of worth to God. The originally proposed statement ended there; however, this phrase struggled to pass. Don Hand, a delegate from Southwest Texas suggested that the period be turned into a comma followed by the phrase "though we do not condone the practice of homosexuality and consider this practice incompatible with Christian doctrine."

Based on its teaching, the United Methodist Church officially prohibits the blessing of weddings of same-sex couples by its clergy and in its churches. As officiating at a same-sex wedding or coming out as an openly LGBT Minister is potentially a chargeable offense, numerous Ministers have been put on trial and defrocked,. The first United Methodist clergy to be defrocked due to being homosexual was Gene Leggett, in 1971, prior to the addition of the Incompatibility Clause which was in 1972. In 1987 Methodist minister Rose Mary Denman, was also defrocked for being openly gay. Similarly, in 2005, clergy credentials were removed from Irene Elizabeth Stroud after she was convicted in a church trial of violating Church law by engaging in a lesbian relationship; this conviction was later upheld by the Church Judicial Council, the highest court in the denomination. Other clergy, however, avoided church trials altogether. The Rev. Val Roseqnuist officiated a same-sex marriage in 2016 and reached a 'just resolution', and a church trial was avoided. Also in 2016, a complaint filed against an openly gay minister was dismissed, and the minister was able to continue working.

The United Methodist Church in addition  supports "laws in civil society that define marriage as the union of one man and one woman." On April 30, 2008, at the General Conference, delegates adopted even more conservative language, stating that Christians are called to "responsible stewardship of this sacred gift" of sexuality and that "sexual relations are affirmed only within the covenant of monogamous, heterosexual marriage." Still, in 2015, the Connectional Table, a general agency of the UMC, proposed a localized option that would permit ministers to officiate same-sex weddings and conferences to ordain openly gay clergy; the Connectional Table, however, cannot legislate church law (a right reserved to the General Conference) and their suggestion was rejected by three-fourths of the delegates at the 2016 General Conference.

As a result of decisions made in April 2008 and August 2009, the United Methodist Church entered into full communion with the Evangelical Lutheran Church in America. The latter denomination allows individuals in committed homosexual relationships to serve as ministers, while the United Methodist Church requires gay clergy to remain celibate. Despite the fact that full communion allows for the interchangeability of all ordained ministers between the two denominations, Lutheran clergy who are involved in homosexual activity are prohibited to serve in the United Methodist Church in order to uphold the integrity of United Methodist ministerial standards. Nevertheless, the UMC has a more ambiguous policy regarding the ordination of transgender pastors and, in 2008,  the Judicial Council ruled that each regional conference can determine their own policy; as a result, some conferences have ordained transgender pastors.

Several grassroots organizations not officially recognized by the United Methodist Church have also formed around positions on issues relating to homosexuality.  The Confessing Movement within the United Methodist Church seeks to continue to protect the United Methodist Church's current stance on homosexuality, if not make it more rigid. Moreover, another movement, Transforming Congregations, is a Methodist ex-gay ministry whose purpose is to "equip the local church to model and minister sanctified sexuality through biblical instruction, personal and public witness, and compassionate outreach. Meanwhile, the Reconciling Ministries Network seeks to change the United Methodist Church's current teaching on homosexuality in order to make the church more inclusive of LGBT people. At the 2008 General Conference of the United Methodist Church, it was decided that the Church would retain its views on homosexuality. At the General Conference in 2016, the delegates deferred the issue of human sexuality to the Council of Bishops in what has been described as a "'historic action'.

In 2016, after General Conference, several Annual Conferences voted in favor of non-discrimination clauses that effectively allowed LGBTQ clergy and which indicated that those conferences would refuse to participate in any church trials in which people were being tried for being an active homosexual. The Baltimore-Washington, California-Nevada, California-Pacific, Desert Southwest, New England, New York, Northern Illinois, and Oregon-Idaho Annual Conferences voted in favor of full inclusion for LGBTQ members and clergy. Additionally, the Virginia Annual Conference voted to petition the UMC to allow LGBTQ clergy and same-gender marriages. The Rocky Mountain Annual Conference voted to not consider sexual orientation when electing a bishop. In 2015, the Great Plains and Greater New Jersey Conferences voted to petition the UMC to allow same-gender marriages. In 2014, the Social and Ethics Ministry of the Central Conference in Germany supported an initiative to propose steps toward the full inclusion of LGBT people. In 2012, the Minnesota Conference had voted to oppose bans on same-gender marriage, and the Illinois Great Rivers and West Michigan Conferences voted that it "expressed sadness" at the actions of 2012 General Conference, and the Arkansas Annual Conference voted to encourage respect for multiple perspectives on human sexuality. The Detroit, Upper New York, and Wisconsin Conferences also supported resolutions supporting allowing same-gender marriages. Bishop Christian Alsted of the Nordic and Baltic Episcopal Area shared that some of the conferences within his region support same-sex marriage. Within the jurisdictions, the Western Jurisdiction and the North Central Jurisdiction have nominated three openly gay candidates for bishop. The Northeastern Jurisdiction passed a resolution supporting same-sex marriage and the ordination of openly gay and lesbian clergy, with the New York body ordaining the first openly gay and lesbian clergy in the denomination. In 2016, the Baltimore-Washington Conference appointed an openly partnered lesbian to the provisional diaconate. In April 2016, Bishop Melvin Talbert performed a same-sex marriage as a public sign of his support for change and full inclusion of LGBT persons. The church also provides spousal benefits for non-ordained employees in same-sex marriages. Some congregations have individually voted to perform same-sex marriages. Also in 2016, the Western Jurisdiction of the denomination elected an openly partnered lesbian as bishop.

However, two United Methodist bishops "voided two resolutions in the Northeastern United States that called for defying church restrictions". Similarly, the United Methodist Bishops of the Central Conferences of Africa unanimously called for "unreserved commitment to the Holy Bible as the primary authority for faith and practice in the Church" and proclaimed that "sexual relations are affirmed only within the covenant bond of a faithful monogamous, heterosexual marriage, and not within same-sex unions or polygamy". United Methodist Bishop Gaspar João Domingos stated that "the United Methodist Church denies the abuse of the principle of tolerance that sets aside the authority of Jesus Christ and the teaching on sexuality." At the same time, the Alabama-West Florida Conference" passed resolutions upholding the denomination's rules on homosexuality" and the Eastern Pennsylvania Conference "approved a resolution that urges the conference to demand clergy accountability to the Discipline's 'rules of our common covenant,' and to call upon clergy to challenge those rules only 'through legitimate channels of holy conferencing, rather than breaking that covenant.'" The Southeastern Jurisdiction also voted to maintain the current language in the Book of Discipline.

On July 15, 2016, the Western Jurisdictional Conference elected Karen Oliveto to become the first openly lesbian Bishop in the United Methodist Church. She was consecrated as Bishop on July 16. She recently served as Pastor at Glide Memorial Church, is an ordained elder, teaches students at the Pacific School of Religion, and is on the Advisory Board of the Forum for Theological Education. Bishop Oliveto is married to Robin Ridenour, a Deaconess in the California-Nevada Conference. However, on 25 April 2017, "In a 6-to-3 vote, the United Methodist Church’s highest court ruled that a married lesbian bishop, and those who consecrated her, had violated church law on marriage and homosexuality"; the United Methodist Church held that she "is in violation of a church law barring the ordination of 'self-avowed practicing homosexuals,' but it did not remove her as bishop, instead sending the issue back to the jurisdiction that chose her." Therefore, the Judicial Council ruled that "Bishop Oliveto 'remains in good standing,' until an administrative or judicial process is completed." However, the Judicial Council also ruled that "she was in good standing" and that "it had no jurisdiction to review Bishop Oliveto's nomination, election, and assignment."

On May 7, 2018 the Council of Bishops in the United Methodist Church proposed allowing individual pastors and regional church bodies to decide whether to ordain LGBT clergy and perform same-sex weddings, though this proposal can only be approved by the General Conference. At this meeting, the Council of Bishops will also consider 2 other alternative plans for the future concerning this issue. The second plan called the Connectional Conference Plan would create three connectional conferences based on theology related to the issue of human sexuality, the current five conferences would be abolished and each of the five conferences would have clearly defined values of accountability, contextualization, and justice. These three denominations would serve almost as three sub-denominations within overall United Methodism.  The third plan, called the Traditional Plan, would reinforce the existing language in the Book of Discipline prohibiting homosexuality, gay marriage ceremonies on church campuses, and allow for stricter enforcement of violations of existing church law. On February 26, 2019, during a special session of the General Conference, delegates from around the world voted to pass the Traditional Plan.

In March 2019, the German Central Conference announced that it would not be implementing the Traditional Plan. Although the US jurisdictions and annual conferences are unable to alter the Book of Discipline as the Central Conferences are, the Western Jurisdiction declared their disagreement with the Traditional Plan and vowed to remain LGBTQ inclusive.

In January 2020, a 16-person committee of bishops and other official submitted to the General Conference a schism proposal for the creation of a new separated "traditional Methodist" denomination, a text that needed to be approved by the scheduled conference in May; the traditionalist connexion is the Global Methodist Church. By default, any parish will be set as a member of the United Methodist Church (UMC) and would have to conduct votes in order to enter in the newborn communion of the more conservative Methodists. The May vote to split the UMC was delayed. Progressives too announced the creation of a new denomination in November 2020, the Liberation Methodist Connexion. In 2022, the Western Jurisdiction elected Cedrick Bridgeforth as a bishop, making him the second openly gay bishop elected in the Jurisidiction and the denomination.

Uniting Church in Australia 
The denomination has permitted presbyteries to ordain openly gay and lesbian ministers if they opt to do so and churches may bless same-sex couples entering into civil partnerships. On 13 July 2018, the Uniting Church in Australia voted by national Assembly to approve the creation of official marriage rites for same-sex couples.

See also

Paul Abels
Gene Leggett

References

External links
Pilgrimage of Faith Research: Research about homosexuality and the Methodist Church of Great Britain
Wesleyan Covenant Association: caucus seeking to maintain the traditional view of homosexuality in the United Methodist Church
Reconciling Ministries Network The largest organization working for equality for LGBT United Methodists

Methodism
Methodism